The 2010 Ohio Bobcats football team represented Ohio University during the 2010 NCAA Division I FBS football season. The Bobcats, led by sixth-year head coach Frank Solich, competed in the East Division of the Mid-American Conference and played their home games at Peden Stadium. They finished the season 8–5, 6–2 in MAC play and were invited to the New Orleans Bowl where they were defeated by Troy 21–48.

Schedule

References

Ohio
Ohio Bobcats football seasons
Ohio Bobcats football